Cairn Hill is a hill with two summits, the higher 475 m, standing 2 nautical miles (3.7 km) east of Duse Bay and 1 nautical mile (1.9 km) southwest of Mineral Hill on Tabarin Peninsula. First charted by the Falkland Islands Dependencies Survey (FIDS) in 1946, who so named it because a cairn was erected on the eastern of the two summits.

References

Geography of Antarctica